Zbigniew Szarzyński (born 7 December 1933) is a Polish footballer. He played in five matches for the Poland national football team from 1957 to 1965.

References

1933 births
Living people
Polish footballers
Poland international footballers
Place of birth missing (living people)
Association footballers not categorized by position